is an interchange passenger railway station located in the city of Yamato, Kanagawa, Japan. It is operated by the private railway operators Tokyu Corporation and Odakyu Electric Railway.

Lines
Chūō-Rinkan Station is served by the Odakyu Enoshima Line and forms the western terminus of the Tōkyū Den-en-toshi Line extending from Shibuya Station (Oshiage Station if including the Hanzomon Line) in Tokyo. It is 35.3 km from the Tokyo terminus of the Odakyu Enoshima Line at Shinjuku Station.

Station layout
The Odakyu portion of the station is above-ground and has two opposed side platforms serving two tracks. The central exit leads to the west end of the station building, and to transfer to the Den-en-toshi Line. There is also a small, unstaffed ticket gate at the north end of the west platform. The Tokyu portion of the stations is underground, and has a single island platform serving two tracks. The ticket gate leads to the east end of the station building and transfer to the Odakyu line. The station consists of two buildings, with a very small, covered, pedestrian street in the middle.

Odakyu platforms

Tokyu platforms

History
On October 15, 1941, it was renamed to its present name. The Tokyu Den-en-toshi Line was extended to Chūō-Rinkan Station on April 9, 1984.

Passenger statistics
In fiscal 2019, the Odakyu part of the station was used by an average of 99,122 passengers daily. During the same period, the Tōkyū part of the station was used by an average of 107,086 passengers daily.

The passenger figures for previous years are as shown below.

Surrounding area

Local transportation
 Taxis – there is a taxi stand on the square outside the east side of the station building (near the Denentoshi line ticket gate)
 Other – the Sagami Country Club, a golf club, has a shuttle bus to the golf club, operating regularly from the Odakyu north exit.

See also
 List of railway stations in Japan

References

External links

 Odakyu station information 
Tokyu station information 

Railway stations in Kanagawa Prefecture
Railway stations in Japan opened in 1929
Odakyū Enoshima Line
Tokyu Den-en-toshi Line
Stations of Odakyu Electric Railway
Stations of Tokyu Corporation
Railway stations in Yamato, Kanagawa